György Kutasi (September 16, 1910 in Fiume – June 29, 1977 in Melbourne, Australia) was a Hungarian water polo player who competed in the 1936 Summer Olympics.

He was part of the Hungarian team which won the gold medal. He played one match as goalkeeper.

See also
 Hungary men's Olympic water polo team records and statistics
 List of Olympic champions in men's water polo
 List of Olympic medalists in water polo (men)
 List of men's Olympic water polo tournament goalkeepers

External links
 

1910 births
1977 deaths
Hungarian male water polo players
Water polo goalkeepers
Water polo players at the 1936 Summer Olympics
Olympic gold medalists for Hungary in water polo
Medalists at the 1936 Summer Olympics
20th-century Hungarian people